György Kulin (Nagyszalonta 28 January 1905 – 22 April 1989 Budapest) was a Hungarian astronomer and discoverer of minor planets. 

He discovered 21 asteroids and is a co-discoverer of the comet C/1942 C1  (Whipple-Bernasconi-Kulin). In addition to astronomy he also wrote some science fiction. The asteroid 3019 Kulin was named in his honor.

References

External links
 Kulin György emlékoldal (Remembering György Kulin) – impressive website associated with the celebrations held in January 2005, the centenary of his birth, with picture gallery and downloadable (but large) sound and video files. Includes comprehensive bibliography. The site is in Hungarian. Accessed 20 July 2005

1905 births
1989 deaths
Discoverers of asteroids

20th-century Hungarian astronomers
Hungarian science fiction writers